Dmitri Ivanovich Varfolomeyev (born 12 June 1993) is a former Russian professional football player.

Club career
He made his Russian Football National League debut for FC Nizhny Novgorod on 5 April 2012 in a game against FC Ural Yekaterinburg.

External links
 
 
 Career summary at sportbox.ru

1993 births
Living people
Russian footballers
Association football midfielders
FC Nizhny Novgorod (2007) players
FC Volga Nizhny Novgorod players